Marie Annonson is a retired elite acrobatic gymnast who currently owns the acrobatic gymnastics facility West Coast Training Center (WCTC) in Livermore, California.

Athletic career
During her acrobatic gymnastics career, Annonson competed nationally and internationally as the base of a women's pair with top Brittany Horrell on California Acrosports Team (CATs) in Sacramento, California with her coach Tonya Case.

In April 2000, Annonson and Horrell took fifth place in the junior division of the Flanders Acro Trophy in Deinze, Belgium.

At the 2001 Azur Acro Cup in Antibes, France during April, Annonson and Horrell placed third all-around (49.150).

In 2002, they competed at the Machuga Cup in Krasnodar, Russia, winning the silver medal right under the reigning Russian world champions. Later on that year, they won the gold at the Winterthur Cup sports acrobatics competition in Winterthur, Switzerland.

The women's pair participated in the first Sports Acrobatics World Age Group Games during November 2001 in Zielona Góra, Poland, where they placed eighth in the all-around.

The pair won the all-around title at the 2002 U.S. National Championships in New Orleans, Louisiana, also winning the 2002 Best Choreography Award for their notable "doll routine".

They also competed at the 2002 Sports Acrobatic World Age Group Games in Riesa, Germany, where they placed sixth in the preliminary round.

Coaching career
Annonson retired from competition and began coaching in 2003.

Among the athletes she has coached are Kristin Allen and Michael Rodrigues, who won the mixed-pair all-around gold medal at the 2009 World Games in Kaohsiung, Taiwan, the first ever gold medal won for the United States in acrobatic gymnastics at a World Games event. In 2010, Annonson also coached Allen and Rodrigues to win the mixed-pair all-around gold medal at the 2010 Acrobatic Gymnastics World Championships in Wroclaw, Poland, the second gold medal ever won for the US in acrobatics at a World Championships.

WCTC athletes includes the 2011 U.S. mixed-pairs champions, Cassie Lim and Brian Kincher. Lim and Kincher also won the mixed-pair gold in the all-around at the 2011 Flanders International Acro Cup in Puurs, Belgium.

In 2009, 2010 and 2011, Annonson was named Coach of the Year by USA Gymnastics.

The members of the 2011 U.S Acrobatic Gymnastics National Team members who trained at WCTC include U.S. Junior National Mixed Pair Champions Ani Smith and Jake Kanavel and the junior women's group of Haley Douglas, Samantha Mihalic and Nicole Potepa. In 2008, 10 out of 20 athletes attending the World Age Group Championships from the USA were from WCTC. In 2010, eight of the 14 members of the U.S. Senior National Acrobatics Gymnastics Team trained at WCTC. Members of the 2010 U.S. junior national team that trained at WCTC include Smith, Kanavel, and the women's group of Cassandra Lim, Alyssa Gardner and Katie Slater. At the 2012 World Championships in Florida, Marie attended as the official Head Coach for the USA Delegation. In 2014, she had 8 National Team members on the USA World Age Group delegation and 2 National Team members on the World Championship delegation.

Within each program at USA Gymnastics, the federation recognizes coaches that have received the highest level of coaching distinction. This title is called the Master of Sport. Marie was added to this honorary list in 2014. Along with that recognition, her athletes Kristin Allen and Michael Rodrigues were also inducted into the USA Gymnastics Hall of Fame, Class of 2015.

After attending the 2016 World Championships with her 13-19 women's group of Morgan Sweeney, Sophie Gruszka, and Amanda Waterson, Marie shifted from full-time Head Coach of WestCoast Training Center to focus solely on running the business portion of WCTC. Michael Rodrigues, her former World Champion, took over as Head Coach and continues that position currently. Marie returned to coaching with Michael and her other team coaches in 2019 however, Michael Rodrigues remains the head coach of WestCoast Training Center.

Marie participated in the FIG Coaching Academy Level 1 in Portugal in 2009 and the FIG Coaching Academy Level 2 in 2015. She passed Level 2 with the second highest marks and plans to pursue obtaining her FIG Coaching Brevet by attending the Level 3 course sometime in the near future.

In 2017, Marie attended the FIG International Judges course in Indianapolis, Indiana and earned her FIG Judging Brevet Category 4. She is also currently a USA Nationally Rated Judge. She has judged at international acrobatic gymnastics competitions in Belgium (2019), Portugal (2020) and will judge for the US at the Acrobatic Gymnastics World Age Group Championships in Switzerland in June 2021.

Other notable contributions Marie has made to the world of Acrobatic Gymnastics is her participation in the Introductory Acrobatic Gymnastics course created and led by her former coach, Tonya Case. This course was created by Tonya while she was the Acrobatic Gymnastics FIG Technical Committee President in order to grow Acrobatic Gymnastics in multiple countries interested in the sport. Marie helped create the 4-day curriculum course and has taught the course in Venezuela (2010), Bolivia (2011), Mozambique - Africa (2012), Mexico (2013 & 2018), Guatemala (2018), & Trinidad & Tobago (2018).

Currently, Marie is focusing on WestCoast Training Center, her acrobatic gymnastics business in Livermore, California. She often travels to teach multi-level acrobatic courses, choreograph acrobatic routines all over the US, judges acrobatic competitions and other varied things such as being a member of the Las Vegas World Cup Organizing Committee and has also choreographed the National Elite Routine in 2017 & 2018 at the Acrobatic Gymnastics National Championships.

References

1974 births
American acrobatic gymnasts
Living people
People from Livermore, California
Female acrobatic gymnasts